Juxian Restaurant was a restaurant located in Taosi Township of Xiangfen County, Shanxi, China, which collapsed at around 9:40 a.m. on August 29, 2020. Twenty-nine people have been confirmed dead.

Background
On the morning of August 29, 2020, a birthday banquet of an 80-year-old person was held at Juxian Restaurant, in Taosi Township of Xiangfen County, north China's Shanxi province. Relatives and fellow villagers attended the birthday banquet.

Collapse
At around 9:40 a.m. on August 29, 2020, the roof of the main hall of Juxian Restaurant suddenly collapsed. A witness said that guests had already arrived but the birthday banquet had not started.

Rescue
After the collapse, the Government of Xiangfen County established a rescue headquarters. Party chief Liu Hao and Magistrate Bai Jiancheng served as commanders, and sent 840 rescuers with over 20 large machines, sniffer dogs, and life detectors to rescue the victims. The local government also sent more than 100 medical workers with 15 ambulances to the site. 

At 1:30 a.m. on August 30, 48 people were recovered, of which 20 were deceased, 21 were slightly injured, and 7 were seriously injured. At about 8:00 a.m., a total of 57 people were recovered, including 29 people dead. 7 were seriously injured and 21 sustained minor injuries.

Investigation
On August 29, 2020, the Work Safety Committee of State Council will supervise the investigation into the restaurant collapse, ordering to screen safety risks of illegal buildings.

The Government of Shanxi set up a special team to investigate and bring those responsible to justice, and ordered a safety inspection over buildings and public gathering places across the province starting August 30.

See also
Collapse of Xinjia Express Hotel

References 

2020 disasters in China
August 2020 events in China
Building collapses in 2020
Building collapses in China
Disasters in restaurants
History of Shanxi
Linfen